Nazirdin Alikbekov (born 14 July 1966) is a Kyrgyzstani former long-distance runner. He competed in the men's marathon at the 1996 Summer Olympics and the 2000 Summer Olympics.

References

External links
 

1966 births
Living people
Athletes (track and field) at the 1996 Summer Olympics
Athletes (track and field) at the 2000 Summer Olympics
Kyrgyzstani male long-distance runners
Kyrgyzstani male marathon runners
Olympic athletes of Kyrgyzstan
Place of birth missing (living people)